Marie Denarnaud (born 1978) is a French actress. She has appeared in numerous films including Chaos (2001), Eager Bodies (2003), The Adopted (2011) and Une histoire banale (2014). She has also participated in the made-for-television film Nuit noire, 17 octobre 1961 (2005) which chronicled the events of the Paris massacre of 1961.

Filmography

References

External links

 

1978 births
Living people
French film actresses
French television actresses
21st-century French actresses
French stage actresses